Kario Salem (born May 23, 1955) is an American television, film, stage actor and screenwriter.

Early life
Salem, who was born and raised in Los Angeles, is a 1973 graduate of Agoura High School in Agoura, California.

Career
In 1997, Salem earned an Emmy Award as a writer for the television special Don King: Only in America, which also earned him a PEN nomination. The film also won the Broadcast Film Critics Award and Peabody Award for Best Television Film of the year. He received a second Emmy nomination the following year for writing The Rat Pack, in addition to a second PEN nomination. He also won as Brad Stephens in Hawaii Five-O season 8 episode, "The Deadly Persuasion".

In 1991, Salem won a Drama-Logue award for his performance in Richard Greenberg's The Extra Man at South Coast Repertory Theater, as well as a Boston Critics award for his performance as "Cousins" in George Bernard Shaw's Major Barbara with Cherry Jones at the American Repertory Theater in Cambridge. Salem also co-starred on Broadway as "Scoop" in The Heidi Chronicles with Mary McDonnel.

In 1975, he starred as Mr. Applegate in the Valley Musical Theatre Institute production of Damn Yankees. Also in the cast were Kevin Spacey and April Winchell, who were both 15 at the time.

He has appeared in over 80 guest starring roles on television, including Francis Campion in Testimony of Two Men (1977), Marcel Pasquinel in Centennial (1978), and the ghost of a dead soldier in an Emmy Award-winning episode of M*A*S*H. His film roles include the role of Jocko in Triumph of the Spirit (1989), the role of The Grand Inquistor in Ridley's Scott's 1492: Conquest of Paradise (1992), and the bleach blonde French gangster in Roger Avary's Killing Zoe (1993).

Salem is also a composer and partner in the music company, "Matter Music", best known for its soundtracks for the films Riding Giants and Wedding Crashers.

In 2018, Salem was hired by Warner Bros./DC Films to write the screenplay for the comic-book movie based on Jack Kirby's New Gods, directed by Ava DuVernay. The movie was no longer moving forward by April 2021.

Recently, Salem decided to revisit his passion for music. Known as K.O., personal support from Bob Dylan, Juval Aviv, and many more has helped spread his music to the masses. K.O.'s music video Stand Down,  starring Billy Bob Thornton, won Best Music Video at the Toronto Shorts International Film Festival and has over 13 million views on Facebook and counting. He is represented by Creative Artists Agency.

Filmography

References

External links

1955 births
American male film actors
American male screenwriters
Primetime Emmy Award winners
Juilliard School alumni
Living people
20th-century American screenwriters
20th-century American male writers
20th-century American male actors
21st-century American screenwriters
21st-century American male writers
Male actors from Los Angeles
Screenwriters from California
Writers from Los Angeles